Blue Frog Bar and Grill is a Western cuisine restaurant chain in China, operated by Blue Frog Catering Management (Shanghai) Co.,Ltd., a member of AmRest. Its headquarters are in the Shanghai Free-Trade Zone in Pudong.

History
It was established in 1999 by Bob Boyce, an American from Harlowton, Montana, and its first restaurant was opened on South Maoming Road in Shanghai in 2002. It established locations in shopping centers catering to upper class customers. In China beef hamburgers are usually eaten as luxury meals; the price of a typical Blue Frog hamburger, in 2017, was equivalent to 15 U.S. dollars. By 2015 the chain had a mapo tofu style burger.

Locations 
In 2015 Blue Frog operated 24 restaurants in seven cities.

References

External links

 Blue Frog
 Blue Frog 

Restaurant chains in China
Restaurants established in 1999
Chinese companies established in 1999